Mestizo art is syncretic art based on European styles adapting to Indigenous sensibilities in the Americas and the Philippines. Mestizo art is part of the Mestizo culture, the culture that emerged, alongside individuals called Mestizos, from the interaction of Spanish conquerors and the Indigenous peoples of the Americas. According to Jaime Barrios Peña, Mestizo art has to be understood in a context where neither pure races or pure cultures exists, and that the process of mestizaje goes beyond biological aspects. 

One of the best-known examples of the Mestizo style is the adaptation made to Late Baroque churches of the 18th century. The ornamentation of their churches has a "two layer quality" observed in carvins, reliefs. According to Britannica:
The areas producing Mestizo-style churches—the southern Peruvian highlands and Alto Perú (now Bolivia), southern and western Mexico, and Guatemala—were centres of high pre-Columbian civilizations and still contained a largely Indigenous or mixed Spanish-Amerindian population, and so the Mestizo style reflected their traditions more successfully than a literally copied version of the European Baroque

Examples
Andean Baroque
Cusco School
Quito School
Virgin of Quito
Chilote School of Religious Imagery
Churches of Chiloé
Mate coquimbano
Mexican muralism
New Spanish Baroque
Earthquake Baroque

References

Bibliography

Mestizo art